South Carolina Highway 69 (SC 69) was a state highway that existed in the southern part of Lexington County. It connected Pelion with Swansea.

Route description
SC 69 began at an intersection with SC 546 (now Cedar Creek Road) southwest of Pelion. It traveled to the northeast to an intersection with U.S. Route 178 (US 178) in Pelion. It then proceeded to the east-southeast to SC 6 in Swansea.

History
SC 32 was established in 1939 from Pelion to Swansea. In 1942, it was extended to its newer western terminus. It was decommissioned in 1947. It was downgraded to secondary roads.

Major intersections

See also

References

External links
Former SC 69 at the Virginia Highways South Carolina Annex

069 (1939–1947)
Transportation in Lexington County, South Carolina